Adriana Diaz may refer to:

Adriana Diaz (journalist) (born 1985), American beauty queen from New York
Adriana Díaz (table tennis) (born 2000), Puerto Rican table tennis player
Adriana Díaz Contreras (born 1970), Mexican politician